Thomas Leonidas Tate (February 18, 1847 – December 4, 1925) was an American politician who served as a member of the Virginia Senate and Virginia House of Delegates.

References

External links
 
 

1847 births
1925 deaths
Democratic Party members of the Virginia House of Delegates
Democratic Party Virginia state senators
19th-century American politicians
20th-century American politicians